Federico Álvarez (born February 9, 1978) is a Uruguayan filmmaker. He is known for directing Evil Dead (2013) and Don't Breathe (2016), as well as his short film Ataque de pánico! (2009).

Life and career
Álvarez was born in Montevideo, Uruguay. In 2009, Álvarez released his short film Ataque de Pánico! on YouTube. Before premiering online, the film screened on October 31, 2009, at the Buenos Aires Rojo Sangre film festival. A few weeks later, Álvarez made a deal with Ghost House Pictures to direct a $30–$40 million sci-fi film. His first project with Ghost House ended up being the direction and co-writing of the Evil Dead remake. After the release of Evil Dead, Álvarez stated that he had "had the temptation to do big franchises", but instead directed and co-wrote the relatively low budget horror film Don't Breathe (2016), which received positive reviews. Álvarez later revealed that during this period he was approached by Marvel Studios to direct an unspecified movie  but he declined feeling he would have little creative control over it. In 2017, Alvarez teamed up with Good Universe to set up their own production company Bad Hombre.

Álvarez directed The Girl in the Spider's Web, a reboot of the English-language The Girl with the Dragon Tattoo series, based on the novel of the same name. The film featured an entirely new cast compared to the 2011 film, and was released on November 9, 2018. In April 2019, Álvarez, alongside Doug Liman, directed reshoots for the 2021 film Chaos Walking, which added an additional $15 million to the film's budget.

In 2021, Álvarez directed all nine episodes of Calls for Apple TV+, a primarily audio-based series with animated visual components. He also co-wrote and co-produced Don't Breathe 2, which was released on August 13, 2021, directed by Rodo Sayagues. In March 2022, it was announced that Álvarez would be writing and directing an Alien film after pitching his own story, and was said to be "unconnected" to the previous films in the franchise, for a release on Hulu.

Unrealized projects
Álvarez was attached to direct a live-action adaptation of the video game Dante's Inferno for Universal Pictures in September 2013, however no further updates have been provided since the announcement. In May 2016, Álvarez was attached to direct an adaptation of Monsterpocalypse for Warner Bros. In October 2016, Álvarez was brought on to direct an adaptation of Incognito for Sony Pictures, based on a script by Daniel Casey. Álvarez was considered to replace Ben Affleck as director for The Batman.

On April 13, 2017, Álvarez was confirmed to direct and co-write a spin-off to Labyrinth with Nicole Perlman and Jay Basu. However, in April 2020, Álvarez announced that he had stepped down as director.

Filmography

Feature films

Short films

Television

Other credits

References

External links
 

1978 births
People from Montevideo
Uruguayan film directors
Uruguayan screenwriters
Horror film directors
Living people